Moufang is the family name of the following people:

Christoph Moufang (1817–1890), a Roman Catholic cleric 
Ruth Moufang (1905–1977), a German mathematician, after whom several concepts in mathematics are named:
 Moufang–Lie algebra
 Moufang loop
 Moufang polygon
 Moufang plane
David Moufang (born 1966), German ambient techno musician